Lomaum Dam is a privately owned hydroelectric dam on the Catumbela River in the Benguela province of central Angola. Completed in 1965, it initially produced  of power, supplying electricity to the towns of Lobito, Benguela and Huambo. This dam was destroyed in 1983 by UNITA after Angola gained independence. This resulted in widespread flooding and the death of ten people. In 1987, Portugal provided credit for the rehabilitation of this structure.

See also

 Energy in Angola

References

Dams completed in 1965
Energy infrastructure completed in 1965
Dams in Angola
Hydroelectric power stations in Angola